The Hawaiian Renaissance (also called the Hawaiian Cultural Renaissance) was the Hawaiian resurgence of a distinct cultural identity that draws upon traditional kānaka maoli culture, with a significant divergence from the tourism-based culture which Hawaiʻi was previously known for worldwide (along with the rest of Polynesia). The Hawaiian Renaissance has been pointed to as a global model for biocultural restoration and sustainability.

First Hawaiian Renaissance 

The First Hawaiian Renaissance had its foundation in the nationalist sentiments of King Kamehameha V. At the time Hawaii was an independent kingdom. The intention was to form a contemporary national identity rather than modeling Hawaii after Great Britain and the culture of the United States. King Kalākaua had a controversial rise to power due to the internal conflicts between family lineage. One half of the island wanted Kalākaua, whereas the other half cheered for his competitor. The result spread tension between the people themselves, but most came to favor Kalākaua as he brought back the Hawaiian culture to urban areas.

Kalākaua took steps to perpetuate nationalism. Kalākaua replaced the considerably Christian national anthem He Mele Lahui Hawaii with Hawaiʻi Ponoʻī in 1876 inspired by Kamehameha I. He had the aged ʻIolani Palace rebuilt starting in 1879 and finishing in 1882.

Despite early efforts to earn favor with the haole people, growing views he was putting his people over the others continued. The Hawaiian people loved him; however, the missionaries' descendants did not enjoy the dealings with Kalākaua. The missionaries' descendants had gained power in Hawai'i by buying land. They were influential enough on the island that they held advisory positions to Kalākaua, though the king didn't always agree with their opinions. He always put his people first, and that sometimes meant denying the missionaries' ideas.

Kalākaua spent three years planning his second coronation in 1883 to try and ease the racial tensions between the Hawaiians and the haoles, and 8,000 people attended. Kalākaua sponsored several traditional Hawaiian practices such as hula, chants, sports, and royal rituals. He also had Hawaiian myths, legends, and chants recorded in media such as the Kumulipo and had his genealogy traced.

Second Hawaiian Renaissance 

The Second Hawaiian Renaissance is generally considered to have started in 1970, and drew from similar cultural movements from the late 1960s and early 1970s.  It is mostly known from music, such as Gabby Pahinui and his work with the Sons of Hawaii, or Keola and Kapono Beamer's traditionalist slack-key music, and their signature twin-hole guitar designs constructed at the Guitar and Lute Workshop.  Other noted Hawaiian musicians who played an integral role in the renaissance were Dennis Pavao, Ledward Kaʻapana, and Nedward Kaʻapana.  The Kaʻapana brothers, along with cousin Pavao formed the falsetto trio, Hui ʻOhana. The musical group "Olomana" contributed greatly to the music of this period with songs like 'O Malia' and 'Mele O Kahoolawe'.

This period in Hawaiian history is also associated with a renewed interest in Hawaiian language, Pidgin, Hula, Traditional Hawaiian Crafts, Hawaiian Studies, and other cultural items.

This period of increase in Hawaiian self-identity was inspired by the 1964 essay "On Being Hawaiian" by writer John Dominis Holt, IV, who brought pride back to being Hawaiian after decades of negative stereotype.

The Merrie Monarch Festival, established in 1964 by Helene Hale, caused a resurgence in the study and practice of ancient hula that had been developed and danced before 1893.

The era also included intense land struggles such as that of Kalama Valley, Kahoʻolawe and Waiāhole-Waikāne, and a resurgence of traditional practices such as loʻi kalo (taro patch) farming, folk arts, and mālama ʻāina (traditional forestry/ land healing and restoration).

Polynesian voyaging is also a large aspect of the Hawaiian Renaissance. In 1975, the Polynesian Voyaging Society built a replica of an ancient Polynesian voyaging canoe.  The vessel, Hōkūle‘a, and the re-adoption of non-instrument wayfinding navigation, Hokule'a and creator and first navigator of Hokulea in 1976, Dr. Ben Finney are icons of the Hawaiian Renaissance and contributors to the resurgence of interest in Polynesian culture.  Hōkūle‘a's  voyage concluded 17 June 2017.   (see Hōkūle‘a)

The movement sometimes touches upon politics, including issues dealing with Native Hawaiians and restoration of Hawaiian independence. Amongst the outcomes was the Constitution of 1978, which produced the Office of Hawaiian Affairs and reclaiming federal land to the State like Kahoolawe.

The height of the Hawaiian Renaissance is usually located during the 1970s, and had mostly waned by 1980, although some refer to it as a still-contemporary movement.

The term "Hawaiian Renaissance" is sometimes also applied to the time period immediately following King Kalākaua's ascendance to the throne, which marked the public return of traditional arts such as the hula, after Calvinist missionary repression had forced these arts underground for several decades.

See also 
National revival
Merrie Monarch Festival
Eddie Kamae
King David Kalākaua I
Polynesian Voyaging Society
Surfing
Luau

References

External links 
 The Hawaiian Renaissance by George Kanahele

History of Hawaii
Native Hawaiian culture
Native Hawaiian history
Politics of Hawaii